Frontera Sur is a 1943 Argentine film directed by Belisario García Villar.

Cast
Inés Edmonson 	
Juan Farías 
César Fiaschi 	
Fernando Lamas 	 		
Diana Maggi 		
Tito Martínez 		
Enrique Núñez 		
Elsa O'Connor 		
Juan Pérez Bilbao 		
Elisardo Santalla 			
Jaime Saslavsky 	 		
Amelia Senisterra 		
Froilán Varela 		
Jorge Villoldo

External links
 

1943 films
1940s Spanish-language films
Argentine black-and-white films
Argentine drama films
1943 drama films
Films directed by Belisario García Villar
1940s Argentine films